Kanti Shah is a Bollywood hindi movies director, producer, screenwriter and writer of  B grade and C grade Hindi movies, especially horror and adult movies. He is best known for directing films featuring Mithun Chakraborty and Dharmendra in later half of the 1990s, like Gunda in 1998,Loha in 1997 and "Kanti Shah ke Angoor".

Early life
Kanti Shah is a Gujarati by origin.

Personal life
Kanti Shah married Surekha Gawli on 6 August 1992 in Mumbai.

Selected filmography

References 

Indian male screenwriters
Film directors from Mumbai
Film producers from Mumbai
Living people
Year of birth missing (living people)
Place of birth missing (living people)
Screenwriters from Mumbai
Gujarati people